Patrick O'Brien (1817 – 12 April 1887) was a wine and spirit merchant and politician in colonial Victoria, a member of the Victorian Legislative Council and later, the inaugural Victorian Legislative Assembly.

Early life
O'Brien was born in Shanna-golden, Limerick, Ireland.

Colonial Australia
O'Brien arrived in New South Wales in 1838 and Port Phillip District in 1840. 
In August 1853 he was elected to the unicameral Victorian Legislative Council for Kilmore, Kyneton and Seymour, a seat he held until the original Council was abolished in March 1856. O'Brien was elected to the seat of South Bourke in the first Victorian Legislative Assembly in November 1856, a seat he held until August 1859 when he lost his bid to be re-elected.

O'Brien died in London, England, he married twice.

References

 

1810 births
1882 deaths
Members of the Victorian Legislative Assembly
Members of the Victorian Legislative Council
Irish emigrants to colonial Australia
19th-century Australian politicians